Benjamin Parke Avery (1828–1875) was an American journalist, poet, essayist, printer, and U.S. ambassador to China. He died in Peking.

Avery arrived in California aboard the Aurora in 1849. He worked as a prospector for a while before buying a drug store in North San Juan and then a newspaper in the mining town.

He became part owner and editor for the Marysville Appeal. A newspaper he established in San Francisco was also contracted as state printer for California.

He was friends with Charles Crocker and Leland Stanford. His death received newspaper coverage and tribute.

After his death, Edward Bosqui wrote a reminisce about him. Ina Coolbrith dedicated a poem to him. The California Historical Society has a collection of papers related to him.

See also
List of ambassadors of the United States to China

References

Ambassadors of the United States to China
19th-century American diplomats
1828 births
1875 deaths
Editors of California newspapers
19th-century American newspaper editors
American male journalists
19th-century American male writers
19th-century American essayists
19th-century American poets
American male poets
Poets from California
People from Nevada County, California
Journalists from California
American printers
19th-century American businesspeople